Dayr Aban (also spelled Deir Aban) was a Palestinian Arab village in the Jerusalem Subdistrict, located on the lower slope of a high ridge that formed the western slope of a mountain, to the east of Beit Shemesh. It was formerly bordered by olive trees to the north, east, and west. The valley, Wadi en-Najil, ran north and south on the west-side of the village. It was depopulated during the 1948 Arab-Israeli War on October 19, 1948, during Operation Ha-Har. It was located 21 km west of Jerusalem. Today there are over 5000 people originally from Dayr Aban living in Jordan.

History
In pre-Roman and Roman times the settlement was referred to as "Abenezer", and may have been the location of the biblical site Eben-Ezer.().

Ottoman era
In 1596, Dayr Aban appeared in Ottoman tax registers as being in the Nahiya of Quds of the Liwa of Quds. It had a population of 23 Muslim households and 23 Christian households; that is, an estimated 127 persons. They paid a fixed tax rate of 33,3% on agricultural products, such as wheat, barley, olives, and goats or beehives; a total of 9,700 Akçe.

Victor Guérin described it in 1863 as being a large village, and its adjacent valley "strewn with sesame." An Ottoman village list from about 1870 found that the village had a population of 443, in a total of 135 houses, though the population count included men, only. 

In 1883,  the PEF's Survey of Western Palestine   described Dayr Aban as "a large village on the lower slope of a high ridge, with a well to the north, and olives on the east, west, and north. This place no doubt represents the fourth century site of Ebenezer (I Sam. IV. I) which is mentioned in the Onomasticon (s.v. Ebenezer) as near Beth Shemesh. The village is 2 miles east of 'Ain Shems."

In 1896 the population of Der Aban was estimated to be about 921 persons.

British Mandate era
In the 1922 census of Palestine, conducted by the British Mandate authorities, Dayr Aban had a population of 1,214 inhabitants, all Muslims, increasing in the 1931 census to 1,534 inhabitants, in 321 houses.

In  the 1945 statistics, the village had a total population of 2,100 Arabs; 10 Christians and 2,090 Muslims, with  a total of 22,734 dunums of land. Of this, Arabs used 1,580 dunams for irrigable land or plantations, 14,925 for cereals, while 54 dunams were built-up (urban) Arab land. 

Dayr Aban had a mosque and a pipeline transporting water from 'Ayn Marjalayn, 5 km to the east. The village contains three khirbats: Khirbat Jinna'ir, Khirbat Haraza, and Khirbat al-Suyyag.

1948, aftermath
On 4 August 1948, two weeks into the Second truce of the 1948 Arab–Israeli War, Grand Mufti of Jerusalem and Palestinian nationalist Amin al Husseini noted that ‘for two weeks now . . . the Jews have continued with their attacks on the Arab villages and outposts in all areas. Stormy battles are continuing in the villages of Sataf, Deiraban, Beit Jimal, Ras Abu ‘Amr, ‘Aqqur, and ‘Artuf . . .’

The village became depopulated on 19–20 October 1948, after a military assault during Operation Ha-Har. Through the second half of 1948, the IDF, under Ben-Gurion’s tutelage, continued to destroy Arab villages, including Dayr Aban on 22 October 1948.

After the war, the ruin of Dayr Abban remained under Israeli control under the terms of the 1949 Armistice Agreement between Israel and Jordan, until such time that the agreement was dissolved in 1967.

The moshav of Mahseya was later established near the site of the old village, on the land of Dayr Aban, as was Tzora, Beit Shemesh and Yish'i.

Etymology
The prefix "Dayr" which appears in many village names is of Aramaic and Syriac-Aramaic origin, and has the connotation of "habitation," or "dwelling place," usually given to places where there was once a Christian population, or settlement of monks. In most cases, a monastery was formerly built there, and, throughout time, the settlement expanded.  Dayr Aban would, therefore, literally mean, "the Monastery of Aban."

Gallery

References

Bibliography

 
 
 (p. 909)

External links
Welcome To Dayr Aban
Dayr Aban,  Zochrot
Survey of Western Palestine, Map 17:  IAA, Wikimedia commons 
 Dayr Aban in Antiquity Archaeological Survey of Israel
Dayr Aban, from the Khalil Sakakini Cultural Center
Dayr Aban دير آبان Palestine Family.net

Arab villages depopulated during the 1948 Arab–Israeli War
District of Jerusalem